The 1998 Missouri Valley Conference men's soccer season was the 8th season of men's varsity soccer in the conference.

The 1998 Missouri Valley Conference Men's Soccer Tournament was hosted by Missouri State and won by Creighton.

Teams

MVC Tournament

See also 

 Missouri Valley Conference
 Missouri Valley Conference men's soccer tournament
 1998 NCAA Division I men's soccer season
 1998 in American soccer

References 

Missouri Valley Conference
1998 NCAA Division I men's soccer season